Simon Woodroffe  (born 14 February 1952) is an English motivational speaker and entrepreneur. He started the sushi chain YO! Sushi in 1997, and appeared as a "Dragon" on the first UK series of Dragons' Den. Woodroffe conceived and launched YO! Sushi after an early spell in television. The business established conveyor belt sushi bars featuring call buttons, robot drinks trolleys, Japanese TV, self heating plates and other such novelties.

He currently speaks around the world at corporate and promotional events, and has appeared on stage at the Edinburgh Festival to discuss his YO! ventures including YO! Company.

Woodroffe received an OBE on 17 June 2006.

Early life 
Woodroffe was born in Oxford in 1952. His father was an army officer and reached the rank of brigadier. His brother Patrick was born in 1954. The family lived in a five-bedroom detached farmhouse in Essex. Woodroffe left Marlborough College towards the end of the 1960s, at the age of 16, with 2 O-levels.

Business career 
Woodroffe founded YO! Sushi in 1997 without the need for start-up capital. At the time that his first restaurant opened, despite its popularity, he was unable to obtain financing from banks. Instead, Woodroffe asked his largest supplier for extended terms to pay off his debt. The company had believed YO! Sushi would be a "safe bet" because it had the support of Honda, Sony, and All Nippon Airways. In a 2008 interview, Woodroffe revealed that in fact those three companies had provided only very limited sponsorship for the business: some cheap televisions and a motorcycle.

In September 2003, Woodroffe sold his controlling interest in YO! Sushi in a £10m deal, backed by private equity firm Primary Capital. Woodroffe retained a 22% stake and continued working as a business entrepreneur, also taking time to present TV programmes. Primary Capital has since sold YO! Sushi. Woodroffe has sold his remaining stake, but is entitled to a royalty of 1% of gross sales in perpetuity.

In 2008, Woodroffe diversified his business portfolio by launching the YOTEL brand of airport and city hotels.

Personal life 
Woodroffe lives with his 18-year-old daughter Charlotte on a £1m houseboat in Chelsea, London.

References

British businesspeople
Officers of the Order of the British Empire
Living people
People educated at Marlborough College
1952 births